The Angolan War of Independence (1961–1974), called in Angola the  ("Armed Struggle of National Liberation"), began as an uprising against forced cultivation of cotton, and it became a multi-faction struggle for the control of Portugal's overseas province of Angola among three nationalist movements and a separatist movement. The war ended when a leftist military coup in Lisbon in April 1974 overthrew Portugal's Estado Novo dictatorship, and the new regime immediately stopped all military action in the African colonies, declaring its intention to grant them independence without delay.

The conflict is usually approached as a branch or a theater of the wider Portuguese Overseas War, which also included the independence wars of Guinea-Bissau and of Mozambique.

It was a guerrilla war in which the Portuguese army and security forces waged a counter-insurgency campaign against armed groups mostly dispersed across sparsely populated areas of the vast Angolan countryside. Many atrocities were committed by all forces involved in the conflict. 

In Angola, after the Portuguese withdrew, an armed conflict broke out among the nationalist movements. This war formally came to an end in January 1975 when the Portuguese government, the National Union for the Total Independence of Angola (UNITA), the Popular Movement for the Liberation of Angola (MPLA), and the National Liberation Front of Angola (FNLA) signed the Alvor Agreement.  Informally, this civil war resumed by May 1975, including street fighting in Luanda and the surrounding countryside.

Background of the territory 

In 1482, the Kingdom of Portugal's caravels, commanded by navigator Diogo Cão, arrived in the Kingdom of Kongo. Other expeditions followed, and close relations were soon established between the two kingdoms. The Portuguese brought firearms, many other technological advances, and a new religion, Christianity. In return, the King of the Congo offered slaves, ivory and minerals.

Novais occupied a strip of land with a hundred families of colonists and four hundred soldiers, and established a fortified settlement. The Portuguese crown granted Luanda the status of city in 1605. Several other settlements, forts and ports were founded and maintained by the Portuguese. Benguela, a Portuguese fort from 1587, a town from 1617, was another important early settlement founded and ruled by Portugal.

The early period of Portuguese incursion was punctuated by a series of wars, treaties and disputes with local African rulers, particularly Nzinga Mbandi, who resisted Portugal with great determination. The conquest of the territory of contemporary Angola started only in the 19th century and was not concluded before the 1920s.

In 1834, Angola and the rest of the Portuguese overseas dominions received the status of overseas provinces of Portugal. From then on, the official position of the Portuguese authorities was always that Angola was an integral part of Portugal in the same way as were the provinces of the Metropole (European Portugal). The status of province was briefly interrupted from 1926 to 1951, when Angola had the title of "colony" (itself administratively divided in several provinces), but it was recovered on 11 June 1951. The Portuguese constitutional revision of 1971 increased the autonomy of the province, which became the State of Angola.

Angola has always had very low population density. Despite having a territory larger than France and Germany combined, in 1960, Angola had just a population of 5 million, of which around 180,000 were whites, 55,000 were mixed race and the remaining were blacks. In the 1970s, the population had increased to 5.65 million, of which 450,000 were whites, 65,000 were mixed race and the remaining were blacks.  Political scientist Gerald Bender wrote "... by the end of 1974 the white population of Angola would be approximately 335,000, or slightly more than half the number which has commonly been reported."

The provincial government of Angola was headed by the Governor-General, who had both executive and legislative powers, reporting to the Portuguese Government, through the Minister of the Overseas. He was assisted by a cabinet made up of a Secretary-General (who also served as his deputy) and several provincial secretaries, each managing a given portfolio. There was a Legislative Council – including both appointed and elected members – with legislative responsibilities that were gradually increased in the 1960s and the 1970s. In 1972, it was transformed in the Legislative Assembly of Angola. There was also a Council of Government, responsible to advice the Governor-General in his legislative and executive responsibilities, which included the senior public officials of the province.

Despite being responsible for the police and other civil internal security forces, the Governor-General did not have military responsibilities, which were vested in the Commander-in-Chief of the Armed Forces of Angola. The Commander-in-Chief reported directly to the Minister of National Defense and the Chief of the General Staff of the Armed Forces. In some occasions however, the same person was appointed to fulfil both the roles of Governor-Geral and Commander-in-Chief, thus assuming both civil as military responsibilities.

In 1961, the local administration of Angola included the following districts: Cabinda, Congo, Luanda, Cuanza Norte, Cuanza Sul, Malanje, Lunda, Benguela, Huambo, Bié-Cuando-Cubango, Moxico, Moçâmedes and Huíla. In 1962, the Congo District was divided in the Zaire and Uige districts and that of Bié-Cuando-Cubando in the Bié and Cuando-Cubango districts. In 1970, the Cunene District was also created by the separation of the southern part of the Huíla District. Each was headed by a district governor, assisted by a district board. Following the Portuguese model of local government, the districts were made of municipalities and these were subdivided in civil parishes, each administered by local council (respectively  and ). In the regions where the necessary social and economic development had not yet been achieved, the municipalities and civil parishes were transitorily replaced, respectively, by administrative circles and posts, each of these governed by an official appointed by the government who had wide administrative powers, performing local government, police, sanitary, economical, tributary and even judicial roles. The circle administrators and the chiefs of administrative posts directed the local native auxiliary police officers known as "sepoys". In these regions, the traditional authorities – including native kings, rulers and tribal chiefs – were kept and integrated in the administrative system, serving as intermediaries between the provincial authorities and the local native populations.

Belligerents

Portuguese forces

The Portuguese forces engaged in the conflict included mainly the Armed Forces, but also the security and paramilitary forces.

Armed Forces
The Portuguese Armed Forces in Angola included land, naval and air forces, which came under the joint command of the Commander-in-Chief of the Armed Forces of Angola. Until 17 June 1961, there was not an appointed Commander-in-Chief, with the joint command in the early stages of the conflict being exercised by the commanders of the land forces, generals Monteiro Libório (until June 1961) and Silva Freire (from June to September 1961). From then on, the role of Commander-in-Chief was performed successively by the generals Venâncio Deslandes (1961–1962, also serving as Governor-General), Holbeche Fino (1962–1963), Andrade e Silva (1963–1965), Soares Pereira (1965–1970), Costa Gomes (1970–1972), Luz Cunha (1972–1974) and Franco Pinheiro (1974), all of them from the Army, except the first one who was from the Air Force. The Commander-in-Chief served as the theatre commander and coordinated the forces of the three branches stationed in the province, with the respective branch commanders serving as assistant commanders-in-chief. With the course of the conflict, the operational role of the Commander-in-Chief and of his staff was increasingly reinforced at the expense of the branch commanders. In 1968, the Military Area 1 – responsible for the Dembos rebelled area – was established under the direct control of the Commander-in-Chief and, from 1970, the military zones were also put under his direct control, with the Eastern Military Zone becoming a joint command. When the conflict erupted, the Portuguese Armed Forces in Angola only included 6500 men, of which 1500 were Metropolitans (Europeans) and the remaining were locals. By the end of the conflict, the number had increased to more than 65 000, of which 57.6% were Metropolitans and the remaining were locals.

The land forces in Angola constituted the 3rd Military Region of the Portuguese Army (renamed "Military Region of Angola, RMA" in 1962). The Military Region was foreseen to include five subordinate regional territorial commands, but these had not yet been activated. The disposition of the army units in the province at the beginning of the conflict had been established in 1953, at that a time when no internal conflicts were expected to happen in Angola, with the Portuguese major military concerns being a foreseen conventional war in Europe against the Warsaw Pact. So, the previous organization of the former Colonial Military Forces based in company-sized units scattered across Angola, also performing internal security duties, had shift to one along conventional lines, based in three infantry regiments and several battalion-sized units of several arms concentrated in the major urban centers, aimed at being able to raise an expeditionary field division to be deployed from Angola to reinforce the Portuguese Army in Europe if a conventional war occurred. These regiments and other units were, however, mostly in cadre strength, serving as training centers for the conscripts drafted in the province. During the conflict, they were responsible to raise the locally recruited field units. Besides the locally raised units, the Army forces in Angola included reinforcement units raised and sent from European Portugal. These were transitory units, mostly made of conscripts (including most of their junior officers and non-commissioned officers), which existed only during the usual two-year period of tour of duty of their members, being disbanded afterwards. The great majority of these units were light infantry battalions and independent companies designated . These battalions and companies were designed to operate autonomously and isolated, without much support from the higher echelons, so having a strong service support component. They were deployed in a grid system along the theatre of operations, with each one being responsible for a given area of responsibility. Usually, a regiment-sized  (battlegroup) commanded a sector, with this being divided in several sub-sectors, each constituting the area of responsibility of a  battalion. Each battalion, in turn, had its field companies dispersed by the sub-sector, each with part of it as its area of responsibility. From 1962, four intervention zones (Northern, Central, Southern and Eastern) were established – renamed "military zones" in 1967 – each grouping several sectors. Due to the low scale guerrilla nature of the conflict, the  company became the main tactical unit, with the standard organization in three rifle and one support platoons, being replaced by one based in four identical sub-units known as "combat groups". The Army also fielded regular units of artillery, armored reconnaissance, engineering, communications, signal intelligence, military police and service support. Besides the regular units, the Army also fielded units of special forces. The Army tried to extend the training of the special  to all the light infantry units, so disbanding those companies in 1962. These proved, however, impracticable and soon other special forces were raised again in the form of the Commandos. The Commandos and a few specially selected  units were not deployed in grid, but served instead as mobile intervention units under the direct control of the higher echelons of command. An unconventional force also fielded by Army was the Dragoons of Angola, a special counterinsurgency horse unit raised in the middle 1960s.

The Portuguese Navy forces were under the command of the Naval Command of Angola. These forces included the Zaire Flotilla (with patrol boats and landing craft operating in the river Zaire), naval assets (including frigates and corvettes deployed to Angola in rotation), Marines companies and Special Marines detachments. While the Marines companies served as regular naval infantry with the role of protecting the Navy's installations and vessels, the Special Marines were special forces, serving as mobile intervention units, specialized in amphibious assaults. The initial focus of the Navy was mainly the river Zaire, with the mission of interdicting the infiltration of guerrillas in Northern Angola from the bordering Republic of Zaire. Later, the Navy also operated in the rivers of Eastern Angola, despite it being a remote interior region at around 1000 km distance from the Ocean.

The Portuguese air assets in Angola were under the command of the 2nd Air Region of the Portuguese Air Force, with headquarters in Luanda. They included a central air base (the Air Base 9 at Luanda) and two sector air bases (the Base-Aerodrome 3 at Negage, Uíge and the Base-Aerodrome 4 at Henrique de Carvalho, Lunda). A fourth air base was being built (Base-Aerodrome 10 at Serpa Pinto, Cuando-Cubando), but it was not completed before the end of the conflict. These bases controlled a number of satellite air fields, including maneuver and alternate aerodromes. Besides these, the Air Force also could count with a number of additional airfields, including those of some of the Army garrisons, in some of which air detachments were permanently deployed. The Air Force also maintained in Angola, the Paratrooper Battalion 21, which served as a mobile intervention unit, with its forces initially being deployed by parachute, but later being mainly used in air assaults by helicopter. The Air Force was supported by the voluntary air formations, composed of civil pilots, mainly from local flying clubs, who operated light aircraft mainly in air logistics support missions. In the beginning of the conflict, the Air Force had only a few aircraft stationed in Angola, including 25 F-84G jet fighter-bombers, six PV-2 Harpoon bombers, six Nord Noratlas transport aircraft, six Alouette II helicopters, eight T-6 light attack aircraft and eight Auster light observation aircraft. By the early 1970s, it had available four F-84G, six PV-2 Harpoon, 13 Nord Noratlas, C-47 and C-57 transport aircraft, 30 Alouette III and Puma helicopters, 18 T-6 and 26 Dornier Do 27 observation aircraft. Despite the increase, the number of aircraft was always too few to cover the enormous Angolan territory, besides many being old aircraft difficult to maintain in flying conditions. From the late 1960s, the Portuguese forces in southern Angola were able to count with the support of helicopters and some other air assets of the South African Air Force, with two Portuguese-South African joint air support centers being established.

Security forces
The security forces in Angola were under the control of the civil authorities, headed by the Governor-General of the province. The main of these forces engaged in the war was the Public Security Police (PSP) and the PIDE (renamed DGS in 1969). By the middle of the 1960s, these forces included 10,000 PSP constables and 1,100 PIDE agents.

The PSP was the uniformed preventive police of Angola. It was modeled after the European Portuguese PSP, but it covered the whole territory of the province, including its rural areas and not only the major urban areas as in the European Portugal. The PSP of Angola included a general-command in Luanda and district commands in each of the several district capitals, with a network of police stations and posts scattered along the territory. The Angolan PSP was reinforced with mobile police companies deployed by the European Portuguese PSP. The PSP also included the Rural Guard, which was responsible for the protection of farms and other agricultural companies. Besides this, the PSP was responsible to frame the district militias, which were employed mainly in the self-defense of villages and other settlements.

The PIDE (International and State Defense Police) was the Portuguese secret and border police. The PIDE Delegation of Angola, included a number of sub-delegations, border posts and surveillance posts. In the war, it operated as an intelligence service. The PIDE raised and controlled the Flechas, a paramilitary unit of special forces made up of natives. The Flechas were initially intended to serve mostly as trackers, but due to their effectiveness they were increasingly employed in more offensive operations, including pseudo-terrorist operations.

Para-military and irregular forces
Besides the regular armed and security forces, there were a number of para-military and irregular forces, some of them under the control of the military and other controlled by the civil authorities.

The OPVDCA (Provincial Organization of Volunteers and Civil Defense of Angola) was a militia-type corps responsible for internal security and civil defense roles, with similar characteristics to those of the Portuguese Legion existing in European Portugal. It was under the direct control of the Governor-General of the province. Its origin was the Corps of Volunteers organized in the beginning of the conflict, which became the Provincial Organization of Volunteers in 1962, also assuming the role of civil defense in 1964, when it became the OPVDCA. It was made up of volunteers that served in part-time, most of these being initially whites, but latter becoming increasingly multi-racial. In the conflict, the OPVDCA was mainly employed in the defense of people, lines of communications and sensitive installations. It included a central provincial command and a district command in each of the Angolan districts. It is estimated that by the end of the conflict there were 20,000 OPVDCA volunteers.

The irregular paramilitary forces, included a number of different types of units, with different characteristics. Under military control, were the Special Groups (GE) and the Special Troops (TE). The GE were platoon-sized combat groups of special forces made up of native volunteers, which operated in Eastern Angola, usually attached to Army units. The TE had similar characteristics, but were made up of defectors from FNLA, operating in Cabinda and Northern Angola. The  was a force made up mostly of exiled Katangese gendarmes from the Front for Congolese National Liberation, which opposed Mobutu regime, being organized in three battalions. The  was a force made up of political exiles from Zambia.

Race and ethnicity in the Portuguese Armed Forces 
Officers and senior NCOs were seconded from the metropolitan army, while junior NCOs were mainly drawn from Portuguese settlers resident in the overseas territories. The rank and file were a mixture of black African volunteers and white conscripts from the settler community doing their obligatory military service. Black  were in theory also liable to conscription but in practice only a limited number were called on to serve. With the change in official status of the African territories from colonies to overseas provinces in 1951, the colonial army lost its separate status and was integrated into the regular forces of Portugal itself. The basis of recruitment for the overseas units remained essentially unchanged.

According to the Mozambican historian João Paulo Borges Coelho, the Portuguese colonial army was segregated along lines of race and ethnicity. Until 1960, there were three classes of soldiers: commissioned soldiers (European and African whites), overseas soldiers (black African  or ), and native soldiers (Africans who were part of the  regime). These categories were renamed to 1st, 2nd and 3rd class in 1960—which effectively corresponded to the same classification. Later, although skin colour ceased to be an official discrimination, in practice the system changed little—although from the late 1960s onward blacks were admitted as ensigns, the lowest rank in the hierarchy of commissioned officers.

Numerically, black soldiers never amounted to more than 41% of the Colonial army, rising from just 18% at the outbreak of the war. Coelho noted that perceptions of African soldiers varied a good deal among senior Portuguese commanders during the conflict in Angola, Guinea and Mozambique. General Costa Gomes, perhaps the most successful counterinsurgency commander, sought good relations with local civilians and employed African units within the framework of an organized counter-insurgency plan.  General Spínola, by contrast, appealed for a more political and psycho-social use of African soldiers. General Kaúlza, the most conservative of the three, feared African forces outside his strict control and seems not to have progressed beyond his initial racist perception of the Africans as inferior beings.

Native African troops, although widely deployed, were initially employed in subordinate roles as enlisted troops or noncommissioned officers. As the war went on, an increasing number of native Angolans rose to positions of command, though of junior rank. After 500 years of colonial rule, Portugal had failed to produce any native black governors, headmasters, police inspectors, or professors; it had also failed to produce a single commander of senior commissioned rank in the overseas Army.

Here Portuguese colonial administrators fell victim to the legacy of their own discriminatory and limited policies in education, which largely barred indigenous Angolans from an equal and adequate education until well after the outbreak of the insurgency. By the early 1970s, the Portuguese authorities had fully perceived these flaws as wrong and contrary to their overseas ambitions in Portuguese Africa, and willingly accepted a true color blindness policy with more spending in education and training opportunities, which started to produce a larger number of black high-ranked professionals, including military personnel.

Nationalist and separatist forces

UPA/FNLA

UPA was created on 7 July 1954, as the Union of the Peoples of Northern Angola, by Holden Roberto, a descendant of the old Kongo Royal House, who was born in Northern Angola but who lived since his early childhood in the Belgian Congo, where he came to work for the local colonial authorities. In 1958, the movement adopts a more embracing designation, becoming the Union of the Peoples of Angola (UPA). In 1960, Holden Roberto signed an agreement with the MPLA for the two movements to fight together against the Portuguese forces, but he ended fighting alone. In 1962, UPA merges with the Democratic Party of Angola, becoming the National Liberation Front of Angola (FNLA), assuming itself as a pro-American and anti-Soviet organization. In the same year, it creates the Revolutionary Government of Angola in Exile (GRAE). UPA and later FNLA was mainly supported by the Bakongo ethnic group which occupied the regions of the old Kingdom of Kongo, including the Northwestern and Northern Angola, as well as parts of the French and Belgian Congos. It had always strong connections with the former Belgian Congo (named Zaire from 1971), including due to Holden Roberto being friend and brother in law of Mobutu Sese Seko.

The armed branch of FNLA was the National Liberation Army of Angola (ELNA). It was mainly supported by Congo/Zaire—where its troops were based and trained—and by Algeria. They were financed by the US and—despite considering themselves anti-communists—received weapons from the Eastern European countries.

MPLA

The People's Movement of Liberation of Angola (MPLA) was founded in 1956, by the merging of the Party of the United Struggle for Africans in Angola (PLUA) and the Angolan Communist Party (PCA). The MPLA was an organization of the left-wing politics, which included mixed race and white members of the Angolan intelligentsia and urban elites, supported by the Ambundu and other ethnic groups of the Luanda, Bengo, Cuanza Norte, Cuanza Sul and Mallange districts. It was headed by Agostinho Neto (president) and Viriato da Cruz (secretary-general), both Portuguese-educated urban intellectuals. It was mainly externally supported by the Soviet Union and Cuba, with its tentative to receive support from the United States failing, as these were already supporting UPA/FNLA.

The armed wing of the MPLA was the People's Army of Liberation of Angola (EPLA). In its peak, the EPLA included around 4500 fighters, being organized in military regions. It was mainly equipped with Soviet weapons, mostly received through Zambia, which included Tokarev pistol, PPS submachine guns, Simonov automatic rifles, Kalashnikov assault rifles, machine-guns, mortars, rocket-propelled grenades, anti-tank mines and anti-personnel mines

UNITA

The Union for the Total Independence of Angola (UNITA) was created in 1966 by Jonas Savimbi, a dissident of FNLA. Jonas Savimbi was the Foreign Minister of the GRAE but entered in course of clash with Holden Roberto, accusing him of having complicity with the US and of following an imperialist policy. Savimbi was member of the Ovimbundu tribe of Central and Southern Angola, son of an Evangelic pastor, who went to study medicine in European Portugal, although never graduating.

The Armed Forces of Liberation of Angola (FALA) constituted the armed branch of UNITA. They had a small number of fighters and were not well equipped. Its high difficulties led Savimbi to make agreements with the Portuguese authorities, focusing more in fighting MPLA.

When the war ended, UNITA was the only one of the nationalist movements that was able to maintain forces operating inside the Angolan territory, with the forces of the remaining movements being eliminated or expelled by the Portuguese Forces.

FLEC

The Front for the Liberation of the Enclave of Cabinda (FLEC) was founded in 1963, by the merging of the Movement for the Liberation of the Enclave of Cabinda (MLEC), the Action Committee of the Cabinda National Union (CAUNC) and the Mayombe National Alliance (ALLIAMA). On the contrary of the remaining three movements, FLEC did not fight for the independence of the whole Angola, but only for the independence of Cabinda, which it considered a separate country. Although its activities started still before the withdrawal of Portugal from Angola, the military actions of FLEC occurred mainly after, being aimed against the Angolan armed and security forces. FLEC is the only of the nationalist and separatist movements that still maintains a guerrilla warfare until today.

RDL

The Eastern Revolt (RDL) was a dissident wing of the MPLA, created in 1973, under the leadership of Daniel Chipenda, in opposition to the line of Agostinho Neto. A second dissident wing was the Active Revolt, created at the same time.

Pre-war events

International politics 
The international politics of the late 1940s and 1950s was marked by the Cold War and the wind of change in the European colonies in Asia and Africa.

In October 1954, the Algerian War was initiated by a series of explosions in Algiers. This conflict would lead to the presence of more than 400,000 French military in Algeria until its end in 1962. Foreseeing a similar conflict in its African territories, the Portuguese military paid acute attention to this war, sending observers and personnel to be trained in the counter-insurgence warfare tactics employed by the French.

In 1955, the Bandung Conference was held in Indonesia, with the participation of 29 Asian and African countries, most of which were newly independent. The conference promoted the Afro-Asian economic and cultural cooperation and opposed colonialism or neocolonialism. It was an important step towards the Non-Aligned Movement.

Following the admission of Portugal to the United Nations in December 1955, the Secretary-General officially asked the Portuguese Government if the country had non-self-governing territories under its administration. Maintaining consistency with its official doctrine that all Portuguese overseas provinces were an integral part of Portugal as was the Portuguese European territory, the Portuguese Government responded that Portugal did not have any territories that could be qualified as non-self-governing and so it did not have any obligation of providing any information requested under the Article 73 of the United Nations Charter.

In 1957, Ghana (former British Gold Cost) becomes the first European colony in Africa to achieve independence, under the leadership of Kwame Nkrumah. In 1958, he organized the Conference of African Independent States, which aimed to be the African Bandung.

The former Belgian Congo and northern neighbor of Angola became independent in 1960, as the Republic of the Congo (known as "Congo-Léopoldville" and later "Congo-Kinshasa", being renamed "Republic of Zaire" in 1971), with Joseph Kasa-Vubu as president and Patrice Lumumba as prime-minister. Immediately after independence, a number of violent disturbances occurred leading to the Congo Crisis. The white population became a target, with more than 80,000 Belgian residents being forced to flee from the country. The Katanga seceded under the leadership of Moïse Tshombe. The crisis led to the intervention of United Nations and Belgian military forces. The Congolese internal conflicts would culminate with the ascension to power of Mobutu Sese Seko in 1965.

John F. Kennedy was inaugurated as President of the United States on 20 January 1961. His Administration started to support the African nationalist movements, with the objective of neutralizing the increasing Soviet influence in Africa. Regarding Angola, the United States started to give direct support to the UPA and assumed an hostile attitude against Portugal, forbidding it to use American weapons in Africa.

In 1964, Northern Rhodesia became independent as Zambia, under the leadership of Kenneth Kaunda. From then on, Angola was almost entirely surrounded by countries with regimes hostile to Portugal, the exception being South West Africa.

Internal politics and rise of Angolan nationalism 

The Portuguese Colonial Act – passed on 13 June 1933 – defined the relationship between the Portuguese overseas territories and the metropole, until being revised in 1951. The Colonial Act reflected an imperialistic view of the overseas territories typical among the European colonial powers of the late 1920s and 1930s. During the period in which it was in force, the Portuguese overseas territories lost the status of "provinces" that they have had since 1834, becoming designated "colonies", with the whole Portuguese overseas territories becoming officially designated "Portuguese Colonial Empire". The Colonial Act subtly recognized the supremacy of the Portuguese over native people, and even if the natives could pursue all studies including university, the de facto situation was of clear disadvantage due to deep cultural and social differences between most of the traditional indigenous communities and the ethnic Portuguese living in the Angola.

Due to its imperialist orientation, the Colonial Act started to be called into question. In 1944, José Ferreira Bossa, former Minister of the Colonies, proposed the revision of the Act, including the end up of the designation "colonies" and the resume of the traditional designation "overseas provinces". On 11 June 1951, a new law passed in the Portuguese National Assembly reviewed the Constitution, finally repulsing the Colonial Act. As part of these, the provincial status was returned to all Portuguese overseas territories. By this law, the Portuguese territory of Angola ceased to be called  (Colony of Angola) and started again to be officially called  (Province of Angola).

In 1948, Viriato da Cruz and others formed the Movement of Young Intellectuals, an organization that promoted Angolan culture. Nationalists sent a letter to the United Nations calling for Angola to be given protectorate status under UN supervision.

In the 1950s, a new wave of Portuguese settlement in all of Portuguese Africa, including the overseas province of Angola, was encouraged by the ruling government of António de Oliveira Salazar.

In 1953, Angolan separatists founded the Party of the United Struggle for Africans in Angola (PLUA), the first political party to advocate Angolan independence from Portugal. In 1954, ethnic Bakongo nationalists in the Belgian Congo and Angola formed the Union of Peoples of Northern Angola (UPA), which advocated the independence of the historical Kingdom of Kongo, which included other territories outside the Portuguese overseas province of Angola.

During 1955, Mário Pinto de Andrade and his brother Joaquim formed the Angolan Communist Party (PCA). In December 1956 PLUA merged with the PCA to form the Popular Movement for the Liberation of Angola (MPLA). The MPLA, led by da Cruz, Mário Andrade, Ilidio Machado, and Lúcio Lara, derived support from the Ambundu and in Luanda.

In March 1959, when inaugurating the new military shooting range of Luanda, the Governor-General of Angola, Sá Viana Rebelo, made the famous Shooting Range Speech, where he predicted a possible conflict in Angola.

General Monteiro Libório assumed the command of the land forces of Angola, with prerogatives of commander-in-chief, in September 1959. He would be the Portuguese military commander in office when the conflict erupts.

Álvaro Silva Tavares assumed the office of Governor-General of Angola in January 1960, being the holder of the office when the conflict erupted.

During January 1961, Henrique Galvão, heading a group of operatives of the DRIL oppositionist movement, hijacked the Portuguese liner Santa Maria. The intention of Galvão was to set sail to Angola, where he would disembark and establish a rebel Portuguese government in opposition to Salazar, but he was forced to head to Brazil, where he liberated the crew and passengers in exchange for political asylum.

Feeling the need of having forces trained in counter-insurgency operations, the Portuguese Army created the Special Operations Troops Centre in April 1960, where companies of special forces (baptized ) started preparations. The first three companies of special  (CCE) were dispatched to Angola in June 1960, mainly due to the Congo Crisis. Their main mission was to protect the Angolan regions bordering the ex-Belgian Congo, each being stationed in Cabinda (1st CCE), in Toto, Uíge (2nd CCE) and Malanje (3rd CCE).

The Baixa de Cassanje revolt

Although usually considered as an event that predates the Angolan War of Independence, some authors consider the Baixa de Cassanje revolt, also known as "Maria's War", as the initial event of the conflict. It was a labour conflict, not related directly with the calls for independence. The Baixa do Cassanje was a rich agricultural region of the Malanje District, bordering the ex-Belgian Congo, with approximately the size of Mainland Portugal, which was the origin of most of the cotton production of Angola. The region's cotton fields were in the hands of the Cotonang - General Company of the Cottons of Angola, a company mostly held by Belgian capital and which employed many natives. Despite its contribution for the development of the region, Cotonang had been accused several times of disrespecting the labour legislation regarding working conditions of its employees, causing it to become under the investigation of the Portuguese authorities, but with no relevant actions against it being yet taken.

Feeling discontent with Cotonang, in December 1960, many of its workers started to boycott work, demanding better working conditions and higher wages. The discontent was seized by infiltrated indoctrinators of the Congolese PSA (African Solidarity Party) to foment an uprising of the local peoples. At that time, the only Portuguese Army unit stationed in the region was the 3rd Special  Company (3rd CCE), tasked with the patrolling and protection of the border with the ex-Belgian Congo. Despite receiving complains from local whites who felt their security threatened, the Governor of the Malanje District, Júlio Monteiro – a mixed race Cape Verdean – did not authorize the 3rd CCE to act against the rebels and also forbade the acquisition of self-defense weapons by the white population. From 9 to 11 January 1961, the situation worsened, with the murder of a mixed race Cotonang foreman and with the surrounding of a 3rd CCE patrol by hundreds of rebels. Finally, on 2 February, the clashes between the rebels and the security forces erupted, with the first shots being fired, causing 11 deaths. By that time, the uprising had spread to the whole Malanje District and threatened to spread to the neighboring districts. The rebel leaders took advantage of the superstitious beliefs of most of their followers to convince them that the bullets of the Portuguese military forces were made of water and so could do no harm. Presumably due to this belief, the rebels, armed with machetes and canhangulos (home-made shotguns), attacked the military en masse, in the open field, without concern for their own protection, falling under the fire of the troops.

Given the limitations of the 3rd CCE to deal with the uprising in such a large region, the Command of the 3rd Military Region in Luanda decided to organize an operation with a stronger military force to subjugate it. A provisional battalion under the command of Major Rebocho Vaz was organized by the Luanda Infantry Regiment, integrating the 3rd CCE, the 4th CCE (stationed in Luanda) and the 5th CCE (that was still en route from the Metropole to Angola). On 4 February, the 4th CCE was already embarked in the train ready to be dispatched to Malanje, when an uprising at Luanda erupted, with several prisons and Police facilities being stormed. Despite the indefinite situation at Luanda and despite having few combat units available there, General Libório, commander of the 3rd Military Region decided to go forward with the sending of the 4th CCE to Malanje, which arrived there on 5 February. The provisional battalion started gradually the operations to subdue the uprising.

The land forces were supported by the Portuguese Air Force, which employed Auster light observation and PV-2 ground attack aircraft. The military forces were able to assume the control of the region by 11 February. By the 16th, the provisional battalion was finally reinforced with the 5th CCE which had been held in Luanda as a reserve force after disembarking in Angola. Baixa do Cassanje was officially considered pacified on 27 February. The anti-Portuguese forces claimed that, during the subduing of the uprising, the Portuguese military bombed villages in the area, using napalm and killing between 400 and 7000 natives. However, the Portuguese military reported that no napalm was ever used in the operations and that the number of rebels dead was inferior to 300, plus 100 registered injured treated at the Malanje Hospital. The military forces suffered two dead and four injured.

After the subdue of the uprising, the Portuguese military pressed the Government-General of Angola to take actions to improve the working conditions of the Cotonang employees in order to solve definitely the situation. The Governor-General Silva Tavares took measures to calm down the situation and on 2 May 1961, the Government decreed the change of the labor legislation related with cotton culture. Apparently, these measures were successful in deeply reducing the discontent among the laborers of the Baixa de Cassanje, with the region remaining peaceful even after the UPA attacks of 15 March 1961.

The 4 and 10 February events at Luanda

The facts about the events of 4 and 10 February 1961 are still very much clouded by the propaganda and contradictory information issued by the various parties about what really happened.

At a time when Luanda was full of foreign journalists that were covering the possible arriving at Angola of the hijacked liner Santa Maria and with the Baixa de Casanje revolt on its peak, on the early morning of 4 February 1961, a number of black militants, mostly armed with machetes, ambushed a Public Security Police (PSP) patrol-car and stormed the Civil Jail of São Paulo, the Military Detection House and the PSP Mobile Company Barracks, with the apparent objective of freeing political prisoners that were being held in those facilities. They were not able to storm other planned targets like the Airport, the National Broadcast Station, post office and military barracks. Different sources indicate the number of militants involved in the attacks as being between 50 and several hundred. The militants were able to kill the crew of the patrol-car, taking their weapons, but their assaults against the several facilities was repulsed, not being able to release any prisoners. In the assaults, the security forces suffered seven dead, including five white and one black police constables and a white Army corporal, besides having several seriously injured elements. Different sources indicate between 25 and 40 attackers killed.

The MPLA always officially claimed to be the originator of the attacks. However, this is contested. Several sources indicate the Angolan nationalist mixed race priest Manuel das Neves as the perpetrator of the attacks. Apparently this was also the PIDE theory, which arrested and sent him to the Metropole, where he was interned in religious houses.

An emotional funeral for the deceased police constables was held on 5 February, which was attended by thousands of persons, the majority being white inhabitants of Luanda. During the funeral, riots broke out, which would cause additional dead. There are several contradictory versions of what happened. The anti-Portuguese line states that the riots were originated by the whites, who desired to revenge the dead police constables, committing random acts of violence against the ethnic black majority living in Luanda's slums (musseques). Contrary versions state that the riots were caused when provocative shots were fired near the cemetery where the funeral was being held, causing panic among the attendants. The riots caused a number of dead, which number varies accordingly with the sources. The anti-Portuguese line describes a massacre carried away by the white inhabitants and the security forces, with hundreds of blacks being killed. Following this line of thought:

However, other sources refer that the theory of the massacre is mere anti-Portuguese false propaganda and that only 19 persons died in the riots. Following this line:

On 10 February, a similar attack was carried out against the Jail of São Paulo. However, the security forces were better prepared and were able to repulse the attacks without any of their men being killed, however, 22 of the attackers were killed. Apparently, other attacks were being planned, but were discovered and averted by the security forces.

Course of the conflict

Beginning of the conflict 

On 15 March 1961, the Union of Peoples of Angola (UPA), under the leadership of Holden Roberto, launched an incursion into northern Angola from its base in the Congo-Léopoldville (ex-Belgian Congo), leading 4,000 to 5,000 militants. His forces took farms, government outposts, and trading centers, killing and mutilating officials and civilians, most of them Ovimbundu "contract workers" from the Central Highlands. It was the start of the Angolan War of Independence and of the wider Portuguese Overseas War. UPA militants stormed the Angolan districts of Zaire, Uíge, Cuanza Norte and Luanda, massacring the civilian population during their advance, killing 1,000 whites and 6,000 blacks (women and children included of both white European and black African descent). Besides the killing of people, the UPA militants destroyed the infrastructures they found on their way, including houses, farms, roads and bridges, creating a general chaos and panic. The terrified populations took refuge in the forests or fled to nearby regions and to Congo-Léopoldville.

However and contrary to the expectations of the UPA, the majority of the white inhabitants that were able to survive the initial attacks did not flee, except some women and children that were evacuated to Luanda. Instead, they entrenched themselves in several towns and villages of the region – including Carmona, Negage, Sanza Pombo, Santa Cruz, Quimbele and Mucaba – resisting the assaults almost without the support of the few existent military forces.

On the same day and on the 16th, the 7th and the 9th Special  companies and the 1st Paratrooper Company were dispatched from the Metropole to Angola by air. Other small units of the same type were dispatched in the following days. Small military columns left Luanda and Carmona to try to rescue some of the isolated populations of the areas under the UPA attacks. On 21 March, the Provisional Battalion of Major Rebocho Vaz – which has acted in the Baixa de Cassange revolt – moved to Cuanza Norte to face the UPA advances.

Without relevant military reinforcements arriving from the Metropole, on 28 March, the Corps of Volunteers of Angola was created, in order to officially frame the civil volunteers that were already fighting the UPA.

In early April, the Massacre of Cólua occurred. The village of Cólua, near Aldeia Viçosa, Uíge had been attacked and its inhabitants massacred by the UPA. A military column from the Provisional Battalion was sent to the village to try to collect the dead bodies. However, an isolated group of soldiers (including two officers) which remained behind was ambushed, with their bodies being later found horribly mutilated. Another military patrol that was sent to the area was also ambushed, with some of their members falling into UPA's hands and also tortured, mutilated and killed. 30 civilians and 11 military were eventually killed at Cólua. Later testimonies report that the UPA militants practiced acts of cannibalism, eating parts of the dead bodies of the soldiers. The Cólua events had an important psychological effect on the Portuguese forces, not only due to the horrifying acts practiced against its soldiers, but also because they realized that the insurgents now dared to attack military forces and not just defenseless civilians.

On 11 April, the Minister of National Defense Júlio Botelho Moniz – discontent with the attitude of Prime Minister Salazar regarding the Overseas policy and the conflict in Angola – lead a coup d'état attempt, which failed. Following the aborted coup and now realizing that the conflict in Angola was more serious than what was initially thought, Prime Minister Salazar dismissed Botelho Moniz and assumed himself the Defense portfolio. On 13 April, Salazar spoke on television about the situation in Angola, using the famous phrase  (To Angola, rapidly and in force). As part of the government remodeling, Adriano Moreira was appointed Overseas Minister, initiating a series of liberal reforms in the Portuguese Overseas territories.

A strong military mobilization was then initiated by the Portuguese Armed Forces. Finally, on 21 March, the first important military contingent from the Metropole (including the Caçadores battalions 88 and 92) embarked in the ocean liner Niassa, arriving at Luanda on 2 May. The cargo ship Benguela also departed to Angola, carrying war material. In a demonstration of force, the military units at Luanda paraded along the main avenue of the city.

On 13 May, the units from the Metropole start to move to Northern Angola, to occupy strategic positions. Until June, Army units were positioned in Damba, Sanza Pombo, São Salvador do Congo and Cuimba, while Fuzileiros (Marines) occupied Tomboco. Due to the blocked roads, destroyed bridges and ambushes, the movement of the units was slow, with the Portuguese forces suffering numerous casualties. After occupying these positions, the Portuguese units initiated the gradual re-occupation of the areas controlled by the UPA.

In June, Air Force General Augusto Venâncio Deslandes was appointed Governor-General of Angola, replacing Silva Tavares. General António Libório was replaced by General Carlos Silva Freire in the role of commander of the 3rd Military Region (commander of land forces of Angola). General Silva Freire would maintain prerogatives of joint Commander-in-Chief until September, when Venâncio Deslandes was also appointed Commander-in-Chief of the Armed Forces of Angola, accumulating this role with that of Governor-General.

On 10 July, the Portuguese forces initiate its first major operation of the conflict, this being Operation Viriato (Viriathus), aimed at re-conquering the town of Nambuangongo, in the Dembos forest, which had been proclaimed by UPA as its capital. The operation was still planned as a conventional-type maneuver, with Caçadores battalions 96 and 114 and Cavalry Squadron 149 converging in Nambuangongo through three axes of attack, with the support of artillery, engineering and air forces. On 9 August, the vanguard of the Battalion 96 of Lieutenant-Colonel Armando Maçanita finally arrived and re-occupied Nambuagongo. In their advance, the three military units suffer 75 casualties, including 21 dead.

The Portuguese forces focused in the re-occupation of the village of Quipedro, in order to eliminate the rebellious forces in the area and to cut off their flight from Nambuangongo to the North, as a follow-up of Operation Viriato. For this, they began Operation Nema, which included the first airborne assault in combat of the Portuguese military history. The operation was carried through between 11 and 21 August, with the 1st Company of the recently created Paratroopers Battalion 21 of Angola jumping by parachute over the target, after preparation air strikes. The rebels were taken by surprise, with the paratroopers being able to occupy Quipedro almost without resistance. They then built an improvised runway and waited for the arriving of Cavalry Squadron 149 that was advancing by land from Nambuangongo.

In August, by order of General Silva Freire, the Northern Intervention Zone (ZIN) was created, encompassing the districts of Luanda, Cabinda, Uige, Zaire, Malange and Cuanza Norte, replacing the so-called "Northern Uprising Zone". Despite not existing still a conflict in this area, an Eastern Intervention Zone (ZIL) – covering the districts of Lunda and Moxico – is also created in the following month.

As part of his reforms, Minister Adriano Moreira decreed the repulsion of the Statute of the Portuguese Indigenous of the Provinces of Guinea, Angola and Mozambique on 6 August. With the abolition of this statute, all Angolans, independently of their race, education, religion and costumes, achieve identical Portuguese citizenship rights and obligations.

On 10 April, the Operation Esmeralda (Emerald) – aimed at cleaning and retaking the control of Pedra Verde, UPA's last base in northern Angola – was initiated by the Special Caçadores Battalion 261, supported by paratroopers, artillery, armored cars and aviation elements. The initial assault was repulsed by the UPA forces, with the Portuguese suffering important casualties. The Portuguese regrouped and, days later, launched a second assault, finally taking control of Pedra Verde on 16 September.

On 9 June, the United Nations Security Council adopted Resolution 163, declaring Angola a non-self-governing territory and calling on Portugal to desist from repressive measures against the Angolan people. The resolution was approved with the votes of China, United States, Soviet Union and of all the non-permanent members, with the abstaining of France and the United Kingdom.

The major military operations finally terminated on 3 October, when a platoon of the Artillery Company 100 reoccupied Caiongo, in the circle of Alto Cauale, Uíge, the last abandoned administrative post that remained unrecovered. This reoccupation ended the almost six-month period during which the UPA fighters were able to control a geographic area with four times the size of European Portugal.

In a speech made on 7 October, the Governor-General and Commanding-in-Chief Venâncio Deslandes announces the termination of the military operations and that from then only police operations would be carried out, although partly in military scope.

During an air reconnaissance in southern Angola on 10 November, the aircraft that was carrying General Silva Freire and his staff crashed, killing him and almost all the officers of the headquarters of the land forces of Angola. Because of this crash, General Francisco Holbeche Fino was appointed commander of the 3rd Military Region.

In the first year of the war, 20,000 to 30,000 Angolans were killed, and between 300,000 and 500,000 refugees fled to Zaïre or Luanda. UPA militants joined pro-independence refugees and continued to launch attacks from across the border in Zaire, creating more refugees and terror among local communities. A UPA patrol took 21 MPLA militant prisoners and then executed them on 9 October 1961 in the Ferreira incident, sparking further violence between the two sides.

Holden Roberto merged UPA with the Democratic Party of Angola (PDA) to form the National Liberation Front of Angola (FNLA) in March 1962. A few weeks later he established the Revolutionary Government of Angola in Exile (GRAE) on 27 March, appointing Jonas Savimbi to the position of Foreign Minister. Roberto established a political alliance with Zairian President Mobutu Sese Seko by divorcing his wife and marrying a woman from Mobutu's wife's village. Roberto visited Israel and received aid from the Israeli government from 1963 to 1969.

Romania was the first state to sign agreements with the MPLA. In May 1974, Nicolae Ceaușescu reaffirmed Romania's support for Angolan independence. As late as September 1975, Bucharest publicly supported all three Angolan liberation movements (FNLA, MPLA and UNITA).

The MPLA held a party congress in Leopoldville in 1962, during which, Viriato da Cruzfound to be slow, negligent, and adverse to planningwas replaced by Agostinho Neto. In addition to the change in leadership, the MPLA adopted and reaffirmed its policies for an independent Angola:
 Democracy
 Multiracialism
 Non-alignment
 Nationalization
 National liberation of the entire colony
 No foreign military bases in Angola

Savimbi left the FNLA in 1964 and founded UNITA in response to Roberto's unwillingness to spread the war outside the traditional Kingdom of Kongo. Neto met Marxist leader Che Guevara in 1965 and soon received funding from the governments of Cuba, German Democratic Republic, and the Soviet Union.

Opening of the Eastern Front

When the EF collapsed, Chipenda and Neto each blamed the other's factions.

UNITA carried out its first attack on 25 December 1966, preventing trains from passing through the Benguela railway at Teixeira de Sousa on the border with Zambia. UNITA derailed the railway twice in 1967, angering the Zambian government, which exported copper through the railway. President Kenneth Kaunda responded by kicking UNITA's 500 fighters out of Zambia. Savimbi moved to Cairo, Egypt, where he lived for a year. He secretly entered Angola through Zambia and worked with the Portuguese military against the MPLA.

UNITA had its main base in distant south-eastern Angolan provinces, where the Portuguese and FNLA influence were for all practical purposes very low, and where there was no guerrilla war at all. UNITA was from the beginning far better organized and disciplined than either the MPLA or the FNLA. Its fighters also showed a much better understanding of guerrilla operations. They were especially active along the Benguela railway, repeatedly causing damage to the Portuguese, and to the Republic of Congo and Zambia, both of which used the railway for transportation of their exports to Angolan ports.

On 19 May 1968, FNLA entered Eastern Angola and carried out its first violent actions in the region against the local populations.

During October 1968, the Portuguese forces initiated Operation  (Victory) against the MPLA, assaulting and destroying its main bases at Eastern Angola. Among others, the Mandume III base (headquarters of the MPLA's III Military Region) was assaulted by the Portuguese Commandos, leading to the capture of important documents.

During the late 1960s, the FNLA and MPLA fought each other as much as they did the Portuguese, with MPLA forces assisting the Portuguese in finding FNLA hideouts.

In the late 1969, the Portuguese forces organize the Battle Group Sirocco ( Siroco), a highly mobile composite task force aimed at hunting and destroying the guerrilla forces operating in Eastern Angola. The land component of the task force was centered in Commando companies, being supported by an air component with helicopters and light aircraft. On 1 September, Battle Group Sirocco initiated a long series of highly successful operations in the Eastern region. Battle Group Sirocco (remodeled as Sirocco 1970 and Sirocco 1971, respectively in 1970 and 1971) would be active for three years, in 1972 being replaced by the similar Battle Group Ray ( Raio).

Portuguese re-focus to the East 
The MPLA began forming squadrons of 100 to 145 militants in 1971. These squadrons, armed with 60 mm and 81 mm mortars, attacked Portuguese outposts. The Portuguese conducted counter-insurgency sweeps against MPLA forces in 1972, destroying some MPLA camps. Additionally, the South African Defence Force engaged the MPLA forces in Moxico in February 1972, destroying the Communist presence. The Portuguese Armed Forces organised a successful campaign to control and pacify the entire Eastern Front (the Frente Leste). Neto, defeated, retreated with 800 militants to the Republic of the Congo. Differing factions in the MPLA then jockeyed for power until the Soviet Union allied with the Chipenda faction. On 17 March 1,000 FNLA fighters mutinied in Kinkuzu, but the Zairian army put down the rebellion on behalf of Roberto.

In 1973 Chipenda left the MPLA, founding the Eastern Revolt with 1,500 former MPLA followers. Tanzanian President Julius Nyerere convinced the People's Republic of China, which had begun funding the MPLA in 1970, to ally with the FNLA against the MPLA in 1973. Roberto visited the PRC in December and secured Chinese support. The Soviet Union cut off aid to the MPLA completely in 1974 when Revolta Activa split off from the mainstream MPLA. In November the Soviet Union resumed aid to the MPLA after Neto reasserted his leadership.

The combined forces of the MPLA, the UNITA, and the FNLA succeeded in their rebellion not because of their success in battle, but because of the Movimento das Forças Armadas' coup in Portugal. The MFA was an organisation of lower-ranked officers in the Portuguese Armed Forces which was responsible for the Carnation Revolution of 25 April 1974, which ended the Portuguese Colonial War and led to the independence of the Portuguese overseas territories.

The MFA overthrew the Lisbon government in protest against the authoritarian political regime and the ongoing African colonial wars, specially the particularly demanding conflict in Portuguese Guinea. The revolutionary Portuguese government removed the remaining elements of its colonial forces and agreed to a quick handover of power to the nationalist African movements. This put an immediate end to the independence war against Portugal, but opened the door for a bitter armed conflict among the independentist forces and their respective allies. Holden Roberto, Agostinho Neto, and Jonas Savimbi met in Bukavu, Zaire in July and agreed to negotiate with the Portuguese as one political entity, but afterwards the fight broke out again.

End of the conflict 
The three party leaders met again in Mombasa, Kenya on 5 January 1975 and agreed to stop fighting each other, further outlining constitutional negotiations with the Portuguese. They met for a third time, with Portuguese government officials, in Alvor, Portugal from 10 till 15 January. They signed on 15 January what became known as the Alvor Agreement, granting Angola independence on 11 November and establishing a transitional government.

The agreement ended the war for independence while marking the transition to civil war. The Front for the Liberation of the Enclave of Cabinda (FLEC) and Eastern Revolt never signed the agreement as they were excluded from negotiations. The coalition government established by the Alvor Agreement soon fell as nationalist factions, doubting one another's commitment to the peace process, tried to take control of the colony by force.

The parties agreed to hold the first assembly elections in October 1975. From 31 January until independence a transitional government consisting of the Portuguese High Commissioner Rosa Coutinho and a Prime Ministerial Council would rule. The PMC consisted of three representatives, one from each Angolan party, and a rotating premiership among the representatives. Every decision required two-thirds majority support. The twelve ministries were divided equally among the Angolan parties and the Portuguese government: three ministries for each party. Author Witney Wright Schneidman criticized this provision in Engaging Africa: Washington and the Fall of Portugal's Colonial Empire for ensuring a "virtual paralysis in executive authority". The Bureau of Intelligence and Research cautioned that an excessive desire to preserve the balance of power in the agreement hurt the transitional Angolan government's ability to function.

The Portuguese government's main goal in negotiations was preventing the mass emigration of white Angolans. Paradoxically, the agreement only allowed the MPLA, FNLA, and UNITA to nominate candidates to the first assembly elections, deliberately disenfranchising Bakongo, Cabindans, and whites. The Portuguese reasoned that white Angolans would have to join the separatist movements and the separatists would have to moderate their platforms to expand their political bases.

The agreement called for the integration of the militant wings of the Angolan parties into a new military, the Angolan Defense Forces. The ADF would have 48,000 active personnel, made up of 24,000 Portuguese and 8,000 MPLA, FNLA, and UNITA fighters respectively. Each party maintained separate barracks and outposts. Every military decision required the unanimous consent of each party's headquarters and the joint military command. The Portuguese forces lacked equipment and commitment to the cause, while Angolan nationalists were antagonistic of each other and lacked training. The treaty, to which the Front for the Liberation of the Enclave of Cabinda (FLEC) never agreed, described Cabinda as an "integral and inalienable part of Angola". Separatists viewed the agreement as a violation of the Cabindan right to self-determination.

All three parties soon had forces greater in number than the Portuguese, endangering the colonial power's ability to keep the peace. Factional fighting renewed, reaching new heights as foreign supplies of arms increased. In February the Cuban government warned the Eastern Bloc that the Alvor Agreement would not succeed. By spring the African National Congress and the South West Africa People's Organization (SWAPO) were echoing Cuba's warning. Leaders of the Organization of African Unity organized a peace conference moderated by Kenyan President Jomo Kenyatta with the three leaders in Nakuru, Kenya in June. The Angolan leaders issued the Nakuru Declaration on 21 June, agreeing to abide by the provisions of the Alvor Agreement while acknowledging a mutual lack of trust which led to violence.

In July fighting again broke out and the MPLA managed to force the FNLA out of Luanda; UNITA voluntarily withdrew from the capital to its stronghold in the south from where it also engaged in the struggle for the country. By August the MPLA had control of 11 of the 15 provincial capitals, including Cabinda and Luanda.  On 12 August, Portugal began airlifting more than 200,000 white Portuguese Angolans from Luanda to Lisbon, via "Operation Air Bridge".  South African forces invaded Angola on 23 October 1975, covertly sending 1,500 to 2,000 troops from Namibia into southern Angola. FNLA-UNITA-South African forces took five provincial capitals, including Novo Redondo and Benguela in three weeks. On 10 November the Portuguese left Angola. Cuban-MPLA forces defeated South African-FNLA forces, maintaining control over Luanda. On 11 November NATO declared the independence of the People's Republic of Angola. The FNLA and UNITA responded by proclaiming their own government based in Huambo. The South African Army retreated and, with the help of Cuban forces, the MPLA retook most of the south in the beginning of 1976.

Many analysts have blamed the transitional government in Portugal for the violence that followed the Alvor Agreement, criticizing the lack of concern about internal Angolan security, and the favoritism towards the MPLA. High Commissioner Coutinho, one of the seven leaders of the National Salvation Junta, openly gave Portuguese military equipment to MPLA forces. Edward Mulcahy, Acting Assistant Secretary of State for African Affairs in the United States State Department, told Tom Killoran, the U.S. Consul General in Angola, to congratulate the PMC rather than the FNLA and UNITA on their own and Coutinho for Portugal's "untiring and protracted efforts" at a peace agreement. Secretary of State Henry Kissinger considered any government involving the pro-Soviet, communist MPLA, to be unacceptable and President Gerald Ford oversaw heightened aid to the FNLA.

Foreign influence

United States 
The situation of the Portuguese in their overseas province of Angola soon became a matter of concern for a number of foreign powers particularly her military allies in NATO. The United States, for example, was concerned with the possibility of a Marxist regime being established in Luanda. That is why it started supplying weapons and ammunition to the UPA, which meanwhile grew considerably and merged with the Democratic Party of Angola to form the FNLA.

The leaders of the FNLA were, however, not satisfied with the US support. Savimbi consequently established good connections with the People's Republic of China, from where even larger shipments started arriving. The USA granted the company Aero Associates, from Tucson, Arizona, the permission to sell seven Douglas B-26 Invader bombers to Portugal in early 1965, despite Portugal's concerns about their support for the Marxists from Cuba and the USSR.

The aircraft were flown to Africa by John Richard Hawke – reportedly, a former Royal Air Force pilot – who on the start of one of the flights to Angola flew so low over the White House, that the United States Air Force forced him to land and he was arrested. In May 1965, Hawke was indicted for illegally selling arms and supporting the Portuguese, but was imprisoned for less than a year. The B-26s were not to see deployment in Angola until several years later.

Rhodesia and South Africa 
Aside from the US, two other nations became involved in this war. These were Rhodesia and South Africa, both of which were ruled by the white minority. Their white-elected governments were concerned about their own future in the case of a Portuguese defeat. Rhodesia and South Africa initially limited their participation to shipments of arms and supplies. However, by 1968 the South Africans began providing Alouette III helicopters with crews to the Portuguese Air Force (FAP), and finally several companies of South African Defence Forces (SADF) infantry who were deployed in southern and central Angola. However, contemporary reports about them guarding the iron mines of Cassinga were never confirmed.

Finally, there were reports that a number of Rhodesian pilots were recruited to fly FAP helicopters. However, when the first Portuguese unit was equipped with Aerospatiale Puma helicopters, in 1969, its crews were almost exclusively South Africans. Rhodesian pilots were considered too valuable by the Royal Rhodesian Air Force (RRAF) to be deployed in support of the Portuguese.

USSR 
During the late 1960s the USSR also became involved in the war in Angola, albeit almost exclusively via the MPLA. While the FNLA received only very limited arms shipments from the US, and the UNITA was getting hardly any support from outside the country, the Marxist MPLA developed very close relations with Moscow and was soon to start receiving significant shipments of arms via Tanzania and Zambia.

In 1969 the MPLA agreed with the USSR that in exchange for arms and supplies delivered to it the Soviets would—upon independence—be granted rights for establishing military bases in the country. Consequently, by the early 1970s, the MPLA developed into the strongest Angolan anti-colonial movement and the most powerful political party.

Aftermath 
As soon as the agreement between the MPLA and Portugal for the transfer of power became known to the public, a mass exodus began. Over 300,000 people left Angola by November, most of them evacuated aboard TAP Boeing 707 aircraft. The British Royal Air Force also lent a hand, sending Vickers VC10 airliners to evacuate about 6,000 additional refugees. At this stage, the Angolan Civil War had started and spread out across the newly independent country. The devastating civil war lasted several decades and claimed a million lives and refugees in independent Angola.

In the wake of the conflict, Angola faced deterioration in central planning, economic development and growth, security, education and health system issues. Like the other newly independent African territories involved in the Portuguese Colonial War, Angola's rank in the human development and GDP per capita world tables fell.  After independence, economic and social recession, corruption, poverty, inequality and failed central planning eroded the initial post-independence expectations. A level of economic development comparable to what had existed under Portuguese rule became a major goal for the governments of the independent territory. The sharp recession and the chaos in many areas of Angolan life eroded the initial impetus of nationalistic fervor. There were also eruptions of black racism in the former overseas province against white and mulatto Angolans.

See also 

 Portuguese Colonial War
 Portuguese West Africa
 Cuba in Angola

References

External links 
  Guerra Colonial: 1961–1974 – State-supported historical site of the Portuguese Colonial War (Portugal)
 OnWar timeline
 U.S. Involvement in Angolan Conflict from the Dean Peter Krogh Foreign Affairs Digital Archive

 
Portuguese Angola
Angolan
•
Wars of independence
1960s conflicts
1970s conflicts
War of Independence
Guerrilla wars
Separatism in Angola
Separatism in Portugal
1960s in Angola
1970s in Angola
Wars involving Angola
Wars involving Cuba
Wars involving Portugal
Wars involving South Africa
Wars involving the states and peoples of Africa
Angola–Portugal relations
Angola–South Africa relations
Communism in Angola
1961 establishments in Angola
1975 disestablishments in Angola
20th century in the Portuguese Empire
African resistance to colonialism